Olga Fielden (1903–1973) was a Belfast based playwright and novelist.

Her novel Island Story (Jonathan Cape, 1933) was described in the Times Literary Supplement as having an "exhilarating quality". Stress (Jonathan Cape, 1936) was similarly described as "fresh and vigorous". John Wilson Foster describes Fielden's fictional world as one in which "violence, degeneration, animal desires and greed battle with the gentler aspirations to refinement, cultivation, decency."

Fielden wrote a number of plays for the BBC and Three To Go was produced by the Abbey Theatre in Dublin.

References

External links 
Olga Fielden papers at Queen's University Belfast

1973 deaths
1903 births
Women novelists from Northern Ireland
20th-century novelists from Northern Ireland
20th-century Irish women writers
20th-century dramatists and playwrights from Northern Ireland
Women dramatists and playwrights from Northern Ireland